Md. Mostafizur Rahman Fizu was a Bangladeshi  politician from Dinajpur belonging to Bangladesh Awami League. He was a member of the Jatiya Sangsad.

Biography
Fizu was a cofounder of Swapnapuri which was established in 1989. He was elected as a member of the Jatiya Sangsad from Dinajpur-6 in the Seventh Jatiya Sangsad Election. His son Shibli Sadique is the current MP of this constituency.

Fizu died in 2006.

References

People from Dinajpur District, Bangladesh
7th Jatiya Sangsad members
2006 deaths
Awami League politicians